The close central unrounded vowel, or high central unrounded vowel, is a type of vowel sound used in some languages. Both the symbol and the sound are commonly referred to as barred i.

The close central unrounded vowel is the vocalic equivalent of the rare post-palatal approximant .

Some languages feature the near-close central unrounded vowel, which is slightly lower.

Features

Occurrence
 is uncommon as a phoneme in Indo-European languages, occurring most commonly as an allophone in some Slavic languages, such as Russian (see ы).

See also
 Index of phonetics articles

Notes

References

External links
 

Close vowels
Central vowels
Unrounded vowels